Naziya is the name of several inhabited localities in Kirovsky District of Leningrad Oblast, Russia.

Urban localities
Naziya, an urban-type settlement under the administrative jurisdiction of  Naziyevskoye Settlement Municipal Formation

Rural localities
Naziya, Putilovskoye Settlement Municipal Formation, Kirovsky District, Leningrad Oblast, a settlement of the crossing in Putilovskoye Settlement Municipal Formation
Naziya, Priladozhskoye Settlement Municipal Formation, Kirovsky District, Leningrad Oblast, a village under the administrative jurisdiction of  Priladozhskoye Settlement Municipal Formation